The 2008–09 Football League Cup (known as the Carling Cup for sponsorship reasons) was the 49th season of the Football League Cup, a knock-out competition for the top 92 football clubs played in English football league system. The winners qualified for the third qualifying round of the 2009–10 UEFA Europa League, if not already qualified for European competitions.

Manchester United won the competition by defeating holders Tottenham Hotspur on penalties in the final on 1 March 2009.

First round 

The draw for the First Round took place on 13 June 2008, with matches being played two months later in the week beginning 11 August 2008.

The 72 Football League clubs competed from the First Round, which was divided into North and South sections. Each section was divided equally into a pot of seeded clubs and a pot of unseeded clubs. Clubs' rankings depend upon their finishing position in the 2007–08 season.

1 Score after 90 minutes

Second round 

Twelve Premier League teams – including the eleven that were not involved in European competitions – entered at this stage, along with the winners from the First Round. The draw for the Second Round took place on 13 August 2008, and the matches were played in the week beginning 25 August 2008, with the exception of Manchester City's game against Brighton & Hove Albion, which was played on 24 September.

1 Score after 90 minutes

Third round 

Eight teams involved in European competition entered at this stage along with the winners from the Second Round. Since nine English teams qualified for European competition in 2008, it was initially unclear precisely which eight teams would automatically enter the third round. Either Aston Villa, who had entered into European competition via the UEFA Intertoto Cup, or Manchester City, who qualified for the UEFA Cup via the UEFA Fair Play ranking would enter in the Third Round with the other entering in the Second Round instead. On 29 July 2008, it was announced that Aston Villa would enter the 2008–09 Carling Cup at the Third Round stage after reaching the second qualifying round of the UEFA Cup.

The draw for the Third Round was held on 30 August 2008, and the matches were played on Tuesday, 23 September and Wednesday, 24 September 2008, with the exception of the match between Brighton & Hove Albion and Derby County, which was played on 4 November.

1 Score after 90 minutes

Fourth round 

The Fourth Round draw took place on Saturday, 27 September, and the matches were played in the week commencing 10 November 2008.

1 Score after 90 minutes

Fifth round 

The Fifth Round draw took place on Saturday, 15 November and the matches were played week in the commencing 1 December 2008.

Semi-finals 

The semi-final draw took place on Saturday, 6 December 2008. The first leg matches were played on Tuesday, 6 January 2009 and Wednesday, 7 January 2009, while the second legs were played on Tuesday, 20 January 2009 and Wednesday, 21 January 2009.

First leg

Second leg 

Manchester United won 4–3 on aggregate.

Tottenham Hotspur won 6–4 on aggregate.

Final 

The final was played at Wembley Stadium, London, on Sunday, 1 March 2009.

Top scorers 

The top scorers in the 2008–09 Football League Cup are as follows:

References

External links 

 Official Carling Cup website
 Carling Cup News at football-league.co.uk
 Carling Cup at bbc.co.uk

 
EFL Cup seasons
Cup
League Cup
Football League Cup, 2008-09